Chen Jiamin (born 1996 in Henan) is a Chinese hurdler specialising in the 100m hurdles.
She won the silver medal at the 2019 Asian Athletics Championships – Women's 100 metres hurdles and qualified for the 2020 Tokyo Olympics. She was second at the National Championships in 2021.

References

 

1996 births
Living people
Chinese female hurdlers
Athletes (track and field) at the 2020 Summer Olympics
Olympic athletes of China